White Water Bay may refer to:
 White Water Bay (New York)
 White Water Bay in Oklahoma, now operating as Six Flags Hurricane Harbor Oklahoma City
 White Water Bay (Texas)
 Whitewater Bay (Everglades)